"Part 18", also known as "The Return, Part 18", is the 18th and final episode of the third season of the TV series Twin Peaks. It was written by Mark Frost and David Lynch, directed by Lynch, and stars Kyle MacLachlan. "Part 18" was broadcast on Showtime along with Part 17 on September 3, 2017, and seen by an audience of 240,000 viewers in the United States. The episode received  critical acclaim.

Plot

Background
The small town of Twin Peaks, Washington, has been shocked by the murder of schoolgirl Laura Palmer (Sheryl Lee) and the attempted murder of her friend Ronette Pulaski (Phoebe Augustine). FBI special agent Dale Cooper (Kyle MacLachlan) has been sent to the town to investigate and has discovered that the killer was Laura's father, Leland Palmer (Ray Wise), who acted while possessed by a demonic entity, Killer BOB (Frank Silva). At the end of the original series, Cooper was trapped in the Black Lodge, an extra-dimensional place, by BOB, who let out Cooper's doppelgänger to use him as his physical access to the world.

Twenty-five years after those events, Cooper manages to escape the Lodge through a portal between worlds; during this process, Cooper was supposed to replace the doppelgänger, but instead he takes the place of a second doppelgänger, Dougie Jones, fabricated by the first as a decoy for the exchange. Cooper's doppelgänger, exhausted from the process, crashes his car and passes out, allowing the police to capture him; he subsequently manages to escape, dividing his time between his search for access to "the Zone" and organizing his minions' attempts to eliminate the now catatonic Cooper, whom Jones's family and colleagues take for the real Dougie. After numerous attempts, Cooper's doppelgänger finds the correct coordinates to access the zone; he is redirected towards the Twin Peaks Sheriff Station, where the real Cooper is also heading after awakening from his incapacitated state. Lucy Brennan (Kimmy Robertson), the station's secretary, shoots the doppelgänger; when BOB, in the form of an orb, tries to escape, he is punched to his destruction by Freddie Sykes (Jake Wardle), an English boy with a Lodge-powered gardening glove. One of the station's prisoners, Naido (Nae Yuuki), turns out to be Diane (Laura Dern), Cooper's assistant, trapped by Cooper's doppelgänger in a deformed body. Cooper then travels through time to the night Laura was killed, seeking to prevent her murder.

Events
In the Black Lodge, Cooper's doppelgänger burns. MIKE (Al Strobel) creates a new Dougie Jones, who rejoins his wife Janey-E (Naomi Watts) and his son Sonny Jim (Pierce Gagnon). Cooper leads Laura through the woods of Twin Peaks, when she suddenly disappears with a scream. Cooper sits in the Lodge, during a sequence similar to one shown before. MIKE asks: "Is it future or is it past?" The Evolution of The Arm asks "Is it the story of the girl who lived down the lane?" Cooper eventually leaves the lodge, where he is greeted by Diane at Glastonbury Grove.

In the morning, Cooper and Diane drive 430 miles to a desert location next to a power line. Diane asks Cooper whether he still wants to take on this task. Cooper warns that once they cross "everything could be different." They drive through an apparent portal, which takes them to a deserted highway at night. When they reach a motel, Cooper checks in, while Diane briefly sees another version of herself. Diane and Cooper have sex in their room that night, but Diane is visibly distressed. The morning after, Cooper wakes up in a different motel room to find Diane gone. He finds a letter signed by "Linda", addressing "Richard", saying that she is gone and asking him not to search for her. Cooper drives to Odessa, Texas; while driving, he finds a diner named "Judy's." There he stops three cowboys (Matt Battaglia, Heath Hensley and Rob Mars) harassing a waitress, Kristi (Francesca Eastwood). Cooper asks Kristi whether another waitress works there, but is told that she has the day off. He gets her address.

Cooper drives to the home of the absent waitress (Sheryl Lee) who, despite looking like Laura, is confused when Cooper calls her Laura, and identifies herself as Carrie Page. When Cooper insists that she is Laura and offers to take her home to Twin Peaks, Carrie, who is already eager to leave Odessa, agrees to follow him. As Carrie packs her things, Cooper takes a quick look around her residence, seeing the body of a man dead from a gunshot wound on her couch, a white figurine of a horse, and an assault rifle on the floor. As they drive through the night, Carrie begins reminiscing about her past in Odessa, and how she tried to keep a clean house despite not knowing any better. When they arrive at Twin Peaks, they pass by the Double R Diner before parking in front of Palmer House. Carrie does not recognize anything. Cooper knocks on the door, but a stranger (Mary Reber) answers. The woman identifies herself as Alice Tremond, and, after speaking to her unseen partner, tells them that they bought the house from a Mrs. Chalfont and that they do not know who the prior owner was or who Sarah Palmer is. Cooper thanks her, and he and Carrie walk away, perplexed. Cooper hesitates and turns again towards the house. While walking mechanically, Cooper asks, "What year is this?" Carrie turns to look at the house and hears Sarah Palmer (Grace Zabriskie) calling out for "Laura." She suddenly screams like Laura; at that moment, all the lights in the house go out, and everything shown onscreen is plunged into darkness.

In the Black Lodge, Laura whispers into Cooper's ear as the credits roll.

Production 
"Part 18", like the rest of the limited series, was written by Mark Frost and David Lynch and directed by Lynch. Frost had already written ten episodes of the original series—the "Pilot" and Episodes 1, 2 and 8 with Lynch, plus Episodes 5, 7, 12, 14, 16, 26 and the original series finale, Episode 29. Lynch also directed six episodes of the original series—the "Pilot", "Episode 2", "Episode 8", "Episode 9", "Episode 14" and "Episode 29".

Music 
The Platters' song "My Prayer" is used during the sex scene between Diane and Cooper; the song had already been used during the closing scene of Part 8. One of the founding members of the group is a singer named David Lynch. The episode's credits are underscored by a piece by Angelo Badalamenti eventually released on the September 2017 soundtrack album Twin Peaks: Limited Event Series Original Soundtrack under the title "Dark Space Low."

Reception 
"Part 18" received critical acclaim. On Rotten Tomatoes, the episode received an 88% rating with an average score of 8.58 out of 10 based on 24 reviews.

Writing for IndieWire, Hanh Nguyen awarded the episode an A, calling the sex scene between Diane and Cooper "one of the most disturbing and fraught scenes in the series," and expressing the necessity to regard "this finale as a true ending to the Twin Peaks saga." She called the episode a "brilliant and no doubt controversial ending for a show that had come back after 25 years to leave fans wanting yet again." In her similarly positive review of the episode, The A.V. Clubs Emily L. Stephens gave the episode an A−, writing that it smashes Part 17's "answers to pieces and poses more staggering questions", ultimately enforcing the "bitter, brutal truth that closure is a luxury, not a guarantee."

The New York Times Noel Murray gave the episode a positive review, saying that he "personally loved" the episode and defining certain scenes as "pure televised poetry," while recognizing some validity to the fans' annoyance over its "elliptical nature".<ref name="nytimes">{{Cite web|url=https://www.nytimes.com/2017/09/04/arts/television/twin-peaks-season-3-finale-recap.html|title=Twin Peaks' Season 3 Finale: The Curtain Call|last=Murray|first=Noel|date=September 4, 2017|website=The New York Times|access-date=November 10, 2017}}</ref> In his recap for Entertainment Weekly, Jeff Jensen favorably compared the episode and its predecessor to Lynch's Lost Highway'', praising the series as a whole as Lynch's "do-over at a big saga fantasy, produced at a length and rich with the poetic abstraction that he couldn’t get from a Hollywood feature film."

Notes

References

External links
 "Part 18" at Showtime
 

2017 American television episodes
Television episodes written by David Lynch
Television episodes written by Mark Frost
Twin Peaks (season 3) episodes
Television episodes about time travel